Štefanov is a village and municipality in Senica District in the Trnava Region of western Slovakia.

History
In historical records the village was first mentioned in 1392.  The church in the village is a Catholic Church built in 1937.

Geography
The municipality lies at an altitude of 205 metres and covers an area of 22.088 km². It has a population of about 1,621 people.  It is located in the Záhorie region of Western Slovakia, on the edge between plains and hills.

References

External links

 Official website

Villages and municipalities in Senica District